San Buenaventura, Spanish for Saint Bonaventure, a Roman Catholic saint, may refer to:

Places

Mexico
 San Buenaventura, Chihuahua
 San Buenaventura, Coahuila
 San Buenaventura Municipality, Coahuila
 San Buenaventura, State of Mexico

Peru
 San Buenaventura District, Marañón
 San Buenaventura District, Canta

United States
 Ventura, California, the official name of which is San Buenaventura
 Mission San Buenaventura, in Ventura
 San Buenaventura de Potano, a 17th-century Spanish mission in Florida
 San Buenaventura de Guadalquini, a 17th-century Spanish mission in Georgia
 San Buenaventura River (legend), a legendary river in the western United States

Elsewhere
 San Buenaventura, La Paz, Bolivia
 San Buenaventura Municipality, La Paz, Bolivia
 San Buenaventura, Usulután, El Salvador
 San Buenaventura, Francisco Morazán, Honduras
 San Buenaventura, a barangay or ward in San Pablo, Laguna, Philippines

People with the surname
 Alonso de San Buenaventura, 16th century Franciscan missionary to Paraguay
 Joy San Buenaventura (born 1959), Filipino-born American politician

See also
Buenaventura (disambiguation)